James Marvin Ligo (died December 2017) was the Anglican Bishop of Vanuatu and New Caledonia, one of the eight dioceses that make up the Anglican Church of Melanesia. He was consecrated and installed as Bishop of Vanuatu on 15 October 2006; the name of his diocese was changed during his time, so he became Bishop of Vanuatu and New Caledonia; he was succeeded as bishop by James Tama.

Ligo was also the Chairman of the Vanuatu Christian Council.

References

Year of birth missing
20th-century births
2017 deaths
21st-century Anglican bishops in Oceania
Anglican bishops of New Hebrides, Vanuatu and New Caledonia